Cumberland was launched at Holyhead in 1826 as a steam packet. In 1839 she underwent conversion to a sail barque. In 1846 Cumberland transported Parkhurst apprentices to the Swan River Colony. She foundered on 23 October 1849 while carrying rice from Bally, Netherlands East Indies, to Hong Kong.

Career

Steam packet
Boulton, Watt, & Co. provided the engines for Cumberland and her sister ship Solvay. She had masts to augment her engines. Because she had to give up potential cargo space to house the engines and the coal they required, her burthen, a measure of cargo volume, was reduced. This was not critical for packets as they carried passengers and mail. Packets under contract to the Royal Mail were banned from carrying cargo.

Cumberland first appeared in Lloyd's Register (LR) in 1827 with J. Beaney, master, Liverpool Shipping Company, owner, and trade Liverpool–London.

Conversion
In 1838–9 Cumberland underwent conversion from steam to sail. She apparently was repaired/restored and became a barque. The removal of her engines and coal bunkers increased her burthen, i.e., her cargo capacity. She appeared twice in Lloyd's Register for 1839. The first entry described her as a steam vessel of 201 tons burthen. Her master was still C. Little, and her owner the St George Company. The entry also had a notation referring the reader to the supplemental pages.  There Cumberland was described as of 609 (430) tons burthen, with G. Shute, master, St George Company, owner, and based in Liverpool. It described her as a barque, and noted that she had undergone a thorough repair in 1839. Lastly, it carried the further notation "Restored 1839–6 yrs."

Barque
Lloyd's Register from 1845 to 1847/48 showed Cumberlands owner as J. Dawson, her homeport as London, and her trade as London–Swan River Colony. It also showed her as having undergone small repairs in 1845. It did not show the name of her master.

In 1846 Cumberland transported Parkhurst apprentices to the Swan River Colony.

Lloyd's Register for 1848/49 showed Cumberlands master as J. Lewis, her owner as J. Dawson, and her trade as London–Bombay. She had had damages repaired and small repairs in 1847.

Special cargos
In September 1834 Cumberland transported the  steam locomotive Stephenson's Rocket from Bowness-on-Solway to Liverpool for the Rainhill Trials; Rocket had come from Newcastle-on-Tyne to Carlisle by horse wagon, and from there by lighter to the Cumberland.

Fate
Lloyd's Register for 1850 carried the annotation "LOST" by  her name. It still carried her master as J. Lewis and her owner as J. Dawson, but it did not give a trade.

She was on a voyage from Bali, Netherlands East Indies, to Hong Kong, with a cargo of rice. "[t]wo passengers (one being Mr. Dawson, the owner) and 28 men were saved, but the captain and five seamen perished".

Notes, citations, and references
Notes

Citations

References
 
Robinson, William, Stephen Lushington, Christopher Robinson, William Scott (Baron Stowell), Great Britain. High Court of Admiralty (1853) Reports of cases argued and determined in the High Court of Admiralty: commencing with the judgments of the Right Hon. Stephen Lushington, Volumes 1-2. (Little, Brown and Company).
 

1826 ships
Packet (sea transport)
Steamships of the United Kingdom
Convictism in Western Australia
Age of Sail merchant ships of England
Maritime incidents in October 1849